Alphonse Fons François Marie de Winter  was a Belgian footballer, born 12 September 1908 in Antwerp, died 7 July 1997.

He was a midfielder for Beerschot VAC. He twice won the Belgian First Division in 1938 and 1939.

He played 19 matches for Belgium, including the last 16 of the 1938 World Cup, against France, at Stade de Colombes (lost, 3-1).

Honours 
 International from 1935 to 1938 (19 caps)
 Participation in the 1938 World Cup (played 1 match)
 Belgian Champions in 1938 and 1939 with Beerschot VAC
 Vice-Champions of Belgium in 1937 with Beerschot VAC

References

External links
 

Belgium international footballers
K. Beerschot V.A.C. players
Belgian football managers
K.S.V. Waregem managers
K.S.K. Beveren managers
Footballers from Antwerp
Belgian footballers
1938 FIFA World Cup players
1908 births
1997 deaths
Association football midfielders